Ronald Allen Hatcher (born July 3, 1939) is a former American football fullback in the National Football League for the Washington Redskins.  He played college football at Michigan State University and was drafted in the eighth round of the 1962 NFL Draft. Hatcher was also selected in the 21st round of the 1962 AFL Draft by the New York Titans.

References 

1939 births
Living people
Players of American football from Pittsburgh
American football fullbacks
Michigan State Spartans football players
Washington Redskins players